The 2009 FIM Speedway European World Championship Grand Prix was the second race of the 2009 Speedway Grand Prix season. It took place on 9 May 2009, in the Alfred Smoczyk Stadium in Leszno, Poland.

On 9 May European Union celebrates Europe day, commemorating the Schuman declaration. The main sponsor was a Polish webside otoMoto.pl.

The European SGP was won by Australian rider Jason Crump.

Riders 

The Speedway Grand Prix Commission nominated Jarosław Hampel as the wild card for the Grand Prix. Damian Baliński and Janusz Kołodziej were nominated as the track reserves. The riders' starting positions draw for Grand Prix meeting was made on 8 May at 13:00 CET by President (=Mayor) of Leszno Tomasz Malepszy.

Heat details

Heat after heat 
 (61.69) Pedersen, Adams, Andersen, Nicholls
 (61.53) Hampel, Holta, Harris, Bjerre
 (61.97) Gollob, Ułamek, Lindgren, Sayfutdinov
 (61.32) Hancock, Crump, Jonsson, Walasek
 (61.87) Jonsson, Harris, Adams, Lindgren
 (61.06) Hancock, Sayfutdinov, Hampel, Andersen
 (61.08) Crump, Pedersen, Holta, Gollob (e)
 (61.60) Ułamek, Bjerre, Walasek, Nicholls
 (62.12) Adams, Gollob, Walasek, Hampel
 (61.28) Crump, Andersen, Harris, Ułamek
 (61.44) Hancock, Bjerre, Pedersen, Lindgren
 (61.38) Jonsson, Sayfutdinov, Holta, Nicholls
 (61.75) Ułamek, Hancock, Holta, Adams
 (61.78) Gollob, Jonsson, Andersen, Bjerre
 (61.56) Sayfutdinov, Walasek, Harris, Pedersen (Fx) Sayfutdinov falls on 1st lap. Pedersen excluded.
 (61.53) Hampel, Crump, Lindgren, Nicholls
 (61.30) Crump, Sayfutdinov, Bjerre, Adams (X) Adams and Bjerre crash - Adams excluded.
 (61.74) Holta, Andersen, Walasek, Lindgren
 (61.89) Jonsson, Pedersen, Hampel, Ułamek
 (61.74) Gollob, Hancock, Nicholls, Harris
 Semi-Finals:
 (61.78) Hancock, Gollob, Hampel, Ułamek
 (61.22) Crump, Jonsson, Pedersen, Sayfutdinov
 The Final:
 (61.68) Crump (6 pts), Gollob (4 pts), Jonsson (2 pts), Hancock (0 pts)

The intermediate classification

See also 
 Speedway Grand Prix
 List of Speedway Grand Prix riders

References

External links 
 FIM-live.com

Europe
2009
Sport in Greater Poland Voivodeship
Leszno
Speedway competitions in Poland